Doğubayazıt is a town of Ağrı Province of Turkey, near the border with Iran. Its elevation is 1625 m. It is the seat of Doğubayazıt District. Its population is 80,061 (2021). Also known as Kurdava, the town was the capital of the self-declared Republic of Ararat, an independent Kurdish state centered in the Ağrı Province.

History

For most of the periods described here, Doğubayazıt was a bigger and more important settlement than the present-day provincial capital Ağrı, not least because this is the Iranian border crossing.

The area has had a rich history with monuments dating back to the time of the Kingdom of Urartu (over 2700 years ago). Before the Ottoman Empire the site was referred to by its Armenian name Daruynk.  In the 4th century the Sasanians failed to capture the Armenian stronghold and royal treasury at Daroynk. Princes of the Bagratid dynasty of Armenia resided at Daroynk and rebuilt the fortress into its present configuration with multiple baileys and towers carefully integrated into the ascending rock outcrop. When King Gagik Arcruni reoccupied the fortress ca.922 A.D. it became the seat of a bishop.  It was subsequently conquered and reconquered by Persians, Armenians, Byzantines, and Seljuks all of whom would have used the plain to rest and recoup during their passages across the mountains.  Turkish peoples arrived in 1064, but were soon followed by the Mongols and further waves of Turks. The castle of Daroynk was repaired many times throughout this history, although it is now named after the Turkish warlord Celayırlı Şehzade Bayazıt Han who ordered one of the rebuildings (in 1374). Ultimately, the town was renamed Beyazit itself in the 16th century.

From the time of the Safavids, the area was ruled by Turkic-speaking generals, later including the Ottoman general İshakpaşa, who built the palace that still bears his name.

The town saw fighting in the Ottoman–Persian War (1821–23) when in 1821 commander-in-chief Abbas Mirza of Qajar Iran occupied the town, as well as when it was attacked by Russia later in 1856, and taken by the Russians during the Russo-Turkish War (1877–78). When the Russians retreated many of the Armenian population left with them to build New Beyazit (now Gavar at Armenia) on the shore of lake Sevan.

Doğubayazıt was further ravaged during World War I and the Turkish War of Independence

Starting in 1920, the area began producing sulphur.

The widely dispersed village of Bayazit, was originally an Armenian settlement and populated by Kurds in 1930 and Yazidis from the Serhat region. But in 1930 the Turkish army destroyed it in response to the Ararat Rebellion. A new town was built in the plain below the old site in the 1930s (hence the new name "Doğubayazıt", which literally means "East Beyazıt").

Doğubayazıt was the capital of the Kurdish Republic of Ararat led by Ibrahim Haski and Ihsan Nuri of the Xoybûn organization between 1927 and 1930. The town was thus dubbed the provisional capital of Kurdistan and was subsequently presented to the League of Nations and the Great Powers as the center of an independent Kurdish state.

In January 2006, Doğubayazıt was the centre of a H5N1 bird flu outbreak. Several children died from the disease after playing with chicken carcasses.

Politics 
In the local elections in March 2019, Yıldız Acar was elected Mayor of the Peoples' Democratic Party (HDP).

Sports 
The Doğubayazıtspor football club plays in the lower divisions of the Turkish football league. It played in the Turkish Third League for three seasons.

Geography  

The town of Doğubayazıt is a settlement with a long history. It lies 15 km southwest of Mount Ararat, 93 km east of the city of Ağrı and 35 km from the Iranian border. The town stands on a plain surrounded by some of Turkey's highest peaks including: Ararat (5,137m), Little Ararat (3,896m), Tendürek Dağı (3,533m), Kaletepe (3,196m) Arıdağı (2,934m) and Göllertepe (2,643m). Kizil Mountain at 2,730m is two kilometers east of the town. The climate on the plain is hot and dry in summer, cold and dry in winter.

Places of interest
Mount Ararat - 15 km from Doğubayazıt, and the best views of the mountain are from here.
Ishak Pasha Palace, completed in 1784 on a hill to the south of town.
The castle and mosque of Old Beyazit, first built by the Urartu but which bear traces of many civilisations.
The "Durupinar" site is up in the hills east of town and south of the main highway.
Balık Gölü - a lake in a lava bed, 60 km from Doğubayazıt, near Taşlıçay.
The Ice Cave - on the side of Little Ararat near the village of Hallaç.
The ruins of the 900BC Urartu temple and palace on the hill of Giriktepe.
A stone formation believed to be Noah's ark.
The ancient Armenian cemetery.

Notable people
 Mahmud Bayazidi, Kurdish philosopher and polymath from Bayazid in the Ottoman Empire.  
 Ibrahim Heski, Kurdish Politician
 Ahmet Arvasi, writer and philosopher
 Kaya Özcan, Wrestler
 Ümit Şamiloğlu, artistic gymnast and part of the national team
 Yıldız Tilbe, Turkish singer of Kurdish descent and one of the best-selling musical artists in Turkey

International relations

Doğubayazıt is twinned with:

  Eilat, Israel
  Podgorica, Montenegro
  Montevideo, Uruguay
  Kitwe, Zambia
  Lusaka, Zambia
  Bulawayo, Zimbabwe
  Kosovska Mitrovica, Serbia
  Gothenburg, Sweden
  Karlstad, Sweden
  Timbuktu, Mali
  Bergen, Norway
  Turku, Finland
  Saarbrücken, Germany
  N'djamena, Chad
  Esbjerg, Denmark

References

External links

Extensive photographic survey, description and plan of Doğubeyazit Castle

Doğubayazıt
Iran–Turkey border crossings
Kurdish settlements in Turkey
Mount Ararat
Former Armenian inhabited settlements